Young, also spelled Yeong, Yong, or Yung, is an uncommon Korean surname, a single-syllable Korean given name, and an element in many two-syllable Korean given names. As given name meaning differs based on the hanja used to write it. There are 43 hanja with the reading  on the South Korean government's official list of hanja which may be registered for use in given names, as well as 28 with the reading  and six with the reading .

Family name
As a Korean family name, Young can be written with three different hanja, indicating different lineages. According to the 2000 South Korean Census, a total of 259 people had these family names.
 (  'eternal'): 132 people and 40 households. Reported bon-gwan (clan hometowns) included Gangnyeong, Gyeongju, and Pyeonghae. Although the family name was found in numerous historical records, it was recorded under the census for the first time in a 1930 survey by Japanese colonial government with one family living in Seoul. More families bearing the surname has been found since then in the contemporary census surveys.  
 (  'flourishing'): 86 people and 20 households. There was one reported bon-gwan, Yeongcheon, and two people whose bon-gwan was not recorded. This character is also used to write a Chinese family name now pronounced Róng in Mandarin.
 (  'shadow' or 'reflection'): 41 people and 15 households. There was one reported bon-gwan, Seoncheon, and one person whose bon-gwan was not recorded. Seoncheon is located in an area that became North Korean territory after the division of Korea; one person with this family name who had come from North Korea and was living in Seoul stated that there had previously been many more people with that family name living near Seoncheon.

Given name

Hanja and meaning
Article 44 of South Korea's  gives the Supreme Court the power to define the list of hanja permitted for use in given names. Under the Supreme Court's regulations, that list consists of the Basic Hanja for educational use and a list of additional hanja permitted for use in given names. There are nine basic hanja for educational use with the reading , as well as five with the reading  and one with the reading  which may be pronounced as  according to the  rule of Korean phonology, among which three have additional approved variant forms

: 'eternal'
: 'flower petals'
( ): 'outstanding'
: 'welcome'
: 'flourishing'
 (variants)
: 'swim'
: 'recite poetry'
: 'manage'
: 'shadow", "reflection'
: 'shine'
( ): 'indistinct'
 (variant)
: 'to force'
: 'to lead'
: 'mountain pass'
 (variants)
: 'to fall' (e.g. of rain)
: 'spirit'
: 'comfortable'
 (variant)

While , the list of additional hanja permitted for use in given names contains 34 hanja with the reading  (including two which are variant forms of another in the same list), 28 hanja with the reading  (with one permitted variant form, and two which are variant forms of one in the list of Basic Hanja for educational use), and five hanja with the reading :
	

: 'clear water'
: 'shine'
: 'shining jade'
 : 'lustrous'
: 'bubbling'
 (variants)
: 'full'
: 'pillar'
: 'bell sound'
: 'baby'
: 'grain'
: 'gemstone'
: 'recite poetry'
: 'tomb'
: 'steep'
: Ying River in Anhui, China
: 'sea'
: 'chinstrap'
: 'sleet'
: 'to have a surplus'
: 'protect'
: a species of Asiatic salamander
: 'moonlight'
: 'flow smoothly'
: 'look ahead'
: a species of tree
: 'goitre'
: name of a style of music
: 'underwater rock'
: 'to be tied up'
: 'to win'
: 'Ying' (capital of the state of Chu)
: 'large'
: 'clever'
: 'sound of jade'
: 'clever'
: 'sunshine'
: 'bell'
: 'age'
: 'clever'
: 'prison'
: 'bamboo screen'
: 'antelope'
: 'wings'
: 'to listen'
: 'to rejoice'
: 'cool and refreshing'
: 'wake' (of a boat)
: 'to whisper'
: 'separate'
: 'window'
: 'salt'
: 'freshly-cooked rice'
: 'cocklebur'
: 'dragonfly'
: 'wheel'
: 'wagtail'
: 'bright moonlight'
: 'fierce'
: 'to flatter'
: 'suffering'
: 'earnest'
: 'mud'

People
Koreans with the single-syllable given name Young include:
Choe Yeong (1316–1388), Goryeo dynasty male general
Song Yeong (born 1950), South Korean male writer
Chin Young (born 1950), South Korean male politician
Kim Young (born 1980), South Korean female professional golfer
Seo Young (born 1984), South Korean actress
You Young (born 2004), South Korean female figure skater

As name element
Names containing this element were popular for newborn boys in South Korea from the 1940s through the late 1960s. Korean names which begin with this element include:

Young-ae
Young-chul
Young-gi
Young-geun
Young-ha
Young-hee
Young-ho
Young-hoon
Young-hwan
Young-ja
Young-jae
Young-jin
Young-joo
Young-jun
Young-mi
Young-min
Young-nam
Yeong-ok
Young-shin
Young-sik
Young-soo
Young-sook
Young-tae
Young-wook

Korean names which end with this element include:

Bo-young
Chae-young
Eun-young
Ga-young
Hwa-young
Hye-young
In-young
Ji-young
Jin-young
Jun-young
Mi-young
Min-young
Mu-young
Na-young
Se-young
Shin-young
So-young
Soo-young
Sun-young
Tae-young

See also
List of Korean given names

References

Korean-language surnames
Korean given names